The Khanbandi dam is a historic dam and reservoir in the Forish District, Jizzakh Region, Uzbekistan. It dates from the 10th century and impounds the rivers Osmonsoy and Ilonchisoy, that flow from the Nuratau Mountains, for irrigation purposes. The dam was added to the UNESCO World Heritage Tentative List on June 1, 1996, in the cultural category.

Site description
From the UNESCO World Heritage Centre:
Eight channels, with 680 dams, were built during the X—XIII centuries in the Samarkand area, and only 4 dams of such scale preserved. The dam of Khanbandi was built at Oslan in Pasttaga gorge. The upper length is 57.75m, the lower is 24.35m, and the altitude is 15.25m. It was constructed from cut granite slabs based on water—resistant solution.  Nine cone—shaped holes, which were made in different altitudes, regulated the water flow. The base of the dam is 4 times thicker than the top. The length of the created reservoir is 1.5 km., the width is 52 m. near the dam, and 200m. near the gorge.

References

 

Dams in Uzbekistan
Central Asia
Uzbekistani culture
World Heritage Tentative List